Mundijong is an outer suburb of the Western Australian capital city of Perth.

Originally named Jarrahdale Junction, it was at the junction of the Rockingham-Jarrahdale line and the government railway line from Perth to Bunbury, which was built in 1893.

At the 2016 census, Mundijong had a population of 1,232.

A town grew up around the junction, and a timber depot, which included a large planing mill, was constructed. The town was first declared as "Manjedal" in 1893 as it was thought to be the Aboriginal name of the area. In 1897 this was found to be incorrect, and the name was changed to Mundijong. It was officially gazetted as a locality on 1 May 1997.

References

Towns in Western Australia
Shire of Serpentine-Jarrahdale